The weightlifting events at the 1932 Summer Olympics in Los Angeles consisted of five weight classes. The competitions were held on Saturday, 30 July 1932 and on Sunday, 31 July 1932.

Medal summary

Participating nations

A total of 29 weightlifters from eight nations competed at the Los Angeles Games:

Medal table

References

Sources
 

 
1932 Summer Olympics events
1932